Thomas Hanna, known by his stage name Timz, is an Iraqi-American rapper of Chaldean descent best known for his song "Iraq". His debut album is entitled Open for Business.

Born in San Diego, California to Iraqi parents from Baghdad, Iraq, he has gained recognition through the political messages in his music. He has also been featured on Fox News, MTV News, and Al-Jazeera, as well as being nominated for "Best Hip-Hop Album" at the 2006 San Diego Music Awards.

He has recorded a theme song for the San Diego Chargers football team, although the team hasn't accepted it.

His music video "Iraq" won the 2007 Hollywood Film Festival Music Video of the Year. It also won MTVu's "The Freshman" in 2007.

In 2011 released an EP titled Future History. The track "Refugee" was released as a single from the EP. The song features vocals from Majid Kakka.

In popular culture
In 2011, Timz co-operated with DJ Outlaw and many other Arab rappers and performers in a rap song "Arab World Unite" representing his mother country, Iraq, in the project. The track released on 2seas Records features Qusai and Ayzee (Saudi Arabia), Timz (Iraq), Rush (Egypt), Murder Eyez (Syria), Balti (Tunisia), Flipp (Bahrain), Talal (Palestine), Vico (Lebanon). The song was uploaded to YouTube by DJ Outlaw and has over 90,000 views.

Discography

Albums
2006: Open for Business

EPs
2011: Future History EP

Videography
2008: "Iraq"
2011: "Refugee" (feat. Majid Kakka)
featured in
2011: "Arab World Unite"

References

 Rieckhoff, Paul. "Meet TIMZ" GNN Guerilla News Network. 25 January 2007. Retrieved 2008-05-25.
  News Hounds. "Iraqi American Tells FOX News Iraq Safer Under Saddam Hussein" January 29, 2007. Retrieved 2008-05-25.
Santos, Ines. "Benefit dinner raises money for children in Iraq". Daily Bruin.  Monday, May 14, 2007 Retrieved 2008-05-25.

External links 
Official Website
Official MySpace

VH1.com - TIMZ Biography by Cyril Cordor, Allmusic

1985 births
American male rappers
American people of Iraqi-Assyrian descent
Living people
Rappers from San Diego
University of San Diego alumni
21st-century American rappers
21st-century American male musicians